is a 2019 Japanese 3D CG anime film based on the Dragon Quest series of video games, adapting the storyline of the 1992 video game Dragon Quest V. It was released in Japan by Toho on August 2, 2019 with an international release on Netflix in 2020.

Plot
The film begins with Luca's birth, followed by him and his father Pankraz leaving Gotha to travel the world to avenge the boy's mother Mada who was kidnapped by monsters. On his childhood travels, Luca meets Bianca while acquiring both a Golden Orb and a sabrecat cub he names Purrcy. While visiting Coburg castle, Luca witnesses prince Harry's abduction by the monsters serving Bishop Ladja and accompanies his father to rescue the prince. But Pankraz is killed by Ladja, using his final moments to reveal to Luca that his mother is still alive.

The boys are then enslaved by Ladja's monsters before they eventually escape as adults after ten years of working on a giant temple with help from Dr. Agon. Harry returns to Coburg and parts ways with Luca, promising to repay him for Pankraz's rescue attempt. After reuniting with a fully-grown Purrcy and his father's retainer Sancho while joined by a slime he named Gootrude, Luca learns that Pankraz assumed him to be the Legendary Hero destined to stop Ladja. Luca also learns that Ladja had abducted Mada as her Zenithian lineage is needed for a ritual to open a portal to the Demon World.

The Zenithian Sword which Luca needs is located in the town of Mostroferrato in the possession of the wealthy nobleman Rodrigo Briscoletti. But the town is terrorized by Bjørn the Behemoose, who stole the sword, with Briscoletti offering the hand of his daughter Nera to whoever defeats Bjørn. Luca manages to defeat the monster with Bianca's help and spares Bjørn when he submits. Though Luca finds himself not to be the Legendary Hero, he is betrothed to Nera until an encounter with a witch (Nera in disguise) convinces him to confess his feelings for Bianca.

Luca decides to break his engagement with Nera and marries Bianca, having a son Alus together. Shortly after, they are attacked by monsters, with Ladja abducting Bianca while turning Luca to stone. Ladja takes Bianca to his temple, revealing her to be a Zenithian before turning her to stone when she refuses to help him convince Mada to teach her the spell to unseal the portal. Luca is revived eight years later by his son Alus, revealed to be the true Legendary Hero that Pankraz searched for. The group seek out the Zenith Dragon, revealed to be Dr. Agon, who needs his Golden Orb to bring them to Ladja's temple. Luca learns the remains of the Golden Orb he possessed was a fake. In order to find the real Golden Orb, Agon sends him to the fairies, who send him back in time to retrieve the real Golden Orb from his childhood-self and switch it with a forgery.

The final battle soon commences with Luca joined by Bjørn and Harry's army as he finally avenges his father, only for a dying Ladja to acquire the spell needed to open the portal. Though Alus seals the portal, reality is suddenly distorted by who is supposed to be Grandmaster Nimzo. The being explains himself to be a computer virus installed in place of the real Nimzo by a hacker, revealing to Luca that he is playing a virtual simulation of Dragon Quest V while proceeding to delete everything. The virus then proceeds to send Luca back to reality, only for Luca's restored real-world memories and the passion for Dragon Quest allowing him to resist. Gootrude then reveals himself to be the game's anti-virus program and gives Luca the means of destroying the virus and restoring the game (in the form of the sword belonging to Dragon Quest character Erdrick).

The game ends when Luca's party arrive at Gotha, with Luca intending to keep this version of the game in his heart. Though when watching the fireworks from Gotha, Bianca hits him playfully, and Luca notes that he actually felt the pain.

Cast

Production
On February 13, 2019, Dragon Quest creator Yuji Horii appeared on the Nippon TV show News Zero and announced that a 3D CG anime film based on the franchise would be released on August 2. Titled Dragon Quest: Your Story, it adapts the 1992 video game Dragon Quest V.

Written and directed by Takashi Yamazaki, it is also directed by Ryuichi Yagi and Makoto Hanafusa. Some of the staff, including Yamazaki and Yagi, previously worked together on the 2014 3D CG anime film Stand by Me Doraemon. Horii supervised the film and it uses Koichi Sugiyama's original music from the games, performed by the Tokyo Metropolitan Symphony Orchestra.

For the film, the dialogue was recorded first and the characters' mouths and expressions were created to match it which is extremely unusual for an anime. Describing the animation, Yamazaki said that it was done at his studio by different animators who created "different forms" of Akira Toriyama's original designs from the video games. The actors recorded their dialogue twice, once two years prior and then with the finished animation.

The first trailer was released on April 4. At the same time, 13 cast members were announced, including Takeru Satoh as the protagonist Ruka and Kasumi Arimura as Bianca. Several additional cast members were announced on May 14. A second trailer and the film's poster were released on June 19.

Lawsuit
In December 2019, Dragon Quest V novelist Saori Kumi filed a lawsuit against the producers of the film, claiming that the characters names she came up with in the novel were being used in the film without permission.

Release
 A premiere of the film was shown at Toho Cinemas in Tokyo on July 16, 2019. It was released in cinemas nationwide on August 2, 2019.

The film premiered internationally on Netflix on February 13, 2020.

Reception
Following the release of the first trailer, some Japanese fans negatively criticized the decision to hire famous live-action actors to voice the characters instead of professional voice actors. Much of the negative criticism was also directed at the character designs, which did not use Akira Toriyama's signature art style of the series.

Dragon Quest: Your Story grossed  during its theatrical run in Japan. It was one of the top 25 highest-grossing Japanese films of 2019.

References

External links
 
 

2019 films
2019 3D films
2019 computer-animated films
2019 anime films
Animated adventure films
Japanese animated fantasy films
Anime films based on video games
Dragon Quest
Animated films about dragons
Animated films about magic
Films about video games
Films about virtual reality
Films directed by Takashi Yamazaki
High fantasy films
Japanese 3D films
Japanese computer-animated films
Japanese fantasy adventure films
Shirogumi
Toho animated films
Films based on Square Enix video games